The Battle of Brownstown was an early skirmish in the War of 1812. Although the United States military outnumbered the forces of Tecumseh's Confederacy 8 to 1, they lost the battle and suffered substantial losses while Tecumseh's forces were almost untouched.

The battle occurred near Brownstown, a Wyandot village south of Fort Detroit on Brownstown creek. Brownstown was also known as "Sindathon's Village". Carlson High School in Gibraltar, Michigan, is near the site of the battle.

Background
Assisted by the British, the Mingo, Wyandotte, Miami, Delaware, Shawnee, Kickapoo, Sauk, Ottawa, Ojibwe, Potawatomi, Mohawk and Chickamauga joined an alliance in 1783 against the United States of America. The alliance was originally formed at the Sandusky villages of the Wyandot, but after those villages were destroyed, the council fire was moved to Brownstown. Walk-in-the-Water and seven other Wyandot chiefs petitioned the U.S. on February 5, 1812, and obtained a 50-year possession of Brownstown and Monguagon; he lived at Brownstown and commanded the Wyandot warriors.

On August 5, 1812, Major Thomas Van Horne and the 200 U.S. soldiers were en route south to the River Raisin, where they were to pick up cattle and other needed supplies and escort them back to Fort Detroit for the use of Brigadier General William Hull.  Hull was, at the time, in the Canadian village of Sandwich, now known as Windsor, Ontario, although he would abandon his position there and return to Detroit on August 8.

Battle

As the U.S. Forces forded Brownstown creek, the 200 U.S. soldiers were set upon by two dozen Native Americans led by the Shawnee war chief Tecumseh, Chickamauga war chief Daimee, Wyandot chief Roundhead, and several others.  Faced with such opposition, Van Horne ordered a retreat, whereupon the untrained American militia scattered in a panic. Van Horne was able to save only half of his command; 18 men were killed, 12 were wounded, and 70 went missing. Most of those listed as "missing" were dispersed during the battle  and returned to Detroit during the ensuing days.

Aftermath
Josiah Snelling, known colloquially as the Prairie Chicken, was cited for gallantry for his actions during the Battle of Brownstown, and promoted to Major. Later, after Hull surrendered Fort Detroit to Tecumseh, Snelling's testimony was used at Hull's court-martial.

One minor chief, Blue Jacket, died in the battle.  This was not the famous Shawnee chief Blue Jacket, but most likely was one of his sons.

Two active battalions of the Regular Army (1-5 Inf and 2-5 Inf) perpetuate the lineage of the old 4th Infantry, elements of which were present at the Battle of Brownstown.

By an act of the United States Congress on June 1, 1813, the widows of those men killed in the battle were awarded half pay for five years. In at least one case, that of Jacob Pence, $953.43 was paid in October 1832 and $422.53 in April, 1839, for a
total of $1,375.96.

References

External links
 https://web.archive.org/web/20161007004451/http://www.michmarkers.com/startup.asp?startpage=S0100.htm

Brownstown
Brownstown
August 1812 events